ILP can refer to:

Computer science

 Inductive logic programming
 Information Leak Prevention
 Instruction-level parallelism
 Integer linear programming

Other
 ilp., a 2013 album by Kwes
 Independent Labour Party, United Kingdom
 Independent Living Program, a US Veteran Affairs program aimed at making sure that each eligible veteran is able to live independently
 Index Librorum Prohibitorum, the list of publications banned by the Catholic Church between 1559 and 1966.
 Individual Learning Plan, a teaching methodology
 Inner Line Permit, a permission required for mainland Indian citizens to be able to travel into a restricted/protected state of North-East India
 Institution of Lighting Professionals, a professional lighting association based in the UK and Ireland.
 Intelligence-led policing
 Isolated Limb Perfusion, a limb-sparing, neoadjuvant therapy for soft tissue sarcomas